Three Essays on Religion: Nature, the Utility of religion, and Theism is an 1874 book by the English philosopher John Stuart Mill, published posthumously by his stepdaughter Helen Taylor, who also wrote the introduction. It is made up of three essays: "Nature" and the "Utility of Religion", were both written between 1850 and 1858, while "Theism" was composed between 1868 and 1870. The book is critical of traditional religious views, instead advocating for a "religion of humanity".

Essays

"Nature" 
In this essay, Mill argues the idea that the morality of an action can be judged by whether it is natural or unnatural. He then lays out the two main conceptions of "nature", the first being "the entire system of things" and the second being "things as they would be, apart from human intervention". Mill argues that neither definition implies that nature can be a source of moral guidance.

"Utility of Religion" 
This essay contends that supernatural religion has an advantage of non-supernatural religion, in that it provides people with the hope that life continues after death. Despite this, Mill is suspicious of people taking advantage of those who seek to survive their deaths.

"Theism" 
In the book's final essay, Mill explores a number of arguments for the existence of God, using a methodology based on evidence. He argues that religion should be "reviewed as a strictly scientific question" and should be tested in the same way that other questions in science are examined. Based on his approach, Mill argues that monotheism is better than polytheism, although this does not necessarily mean that monotheism is more correct.

References

External links 

 Three Essays on Religion at HathiTrust Digital Library
 
 John Stuart Mill at Early Modern Texts (collection of ebooks, including Three Essays on Religion)

1874 non-fiction books
Books by John Stuart Mill
Ethics books
Longman books
Philosophy of religion literature
Theology books